The Diocese of Kondoa may refer to;

Anglican Diocese of Kondoa, in Tanzania
Roman Catholic Diocese of Kondoa, in Tanzania